The Kherson electoral district was a constituency created for the 1917 Russian Constituent Assembly election.

The electoral district covered the Kherson Governorate. According to the U.S. historian Oliver Henry Radkey, whose account is the source for the results table below, the Odessa city results appeared complete, the Odessa uezd possibly incomplete, the Kherson uezd having results from 195 out of 223 voting centers, no indication about whether 2 other uezds results were complete or not. From the remaining 2 uezds the results were missing altogether.

Odessa witnessed fierce competition for the Jewish vote, with fist-fights between Bundists and Zionists. David Lvovich of Fareynikte was elected as a SR list candidate.

Results

References

Electoral districts of the Russian Constituent Assembly election, 1917
1910s elections in Ukraine